Makaa may refer to:

Makaa language of Cameroon
Maka people, the people who speak that language